This is a list of the birds that belong to the group gadfly petrels. They are all from the genus Pterodroma and belong to the family Procellariidae.

 Pterodroma macroptera, great-winged petrel, breeds and ranges on islands of the southern oceans
 Pterodroma gouldi, grey-faced petrel, breeds on islands off the coast of the North Island, New Zealand, and off the coast of southwestern Australia
 Pterodroma neglecta, Kermadec petrel, breeds on islands of the south Pacific from New Zealand to Easter Island, Juan Fernández Islands, San Ambrosio, and San Félix
 Pterodroma neglecta neglecta breeds on south Pacific islands from New Zealand to Easter Island
 Pterodroma neglecta juana breeds on Juan Fernández Islands, San Ambrosio, and San Félix
 Pterodroma magentae, magenta petrel, breeds on Chatham Islands
 Pterodroma arminjoniana, herald petrel breeds on Raine Island, Tonga, French Polynesia to Easter Island, Trindade Island and Martín Vaz
 Pterodroma arminjoniana arminjoniana breeds on Trindade Island and Martín Vaz
 Pterodroma arminjoniana heraldica breeds on Raine Island, Tonga, and French Polynesia to Easter Island
 Pterodroma ultima, Murphy's petrel breeds on Tuamotu Archipelago, Austral Islands and Pitcairn Island
 Pterodroma solandri, providence petrel breeds on Lord Howe Island and Philip Island; ranges to northwestern Pacific Ocean
 Pterodroma atrata, Henderson petrel breeds on Henderson Island
 Pterodroma madeira, Zino's petrel breeds on Madeira Island; ranges to east Atlantic Ocean
 Pterodroma feae, Fea's petrel breeds on the Cape Verde Islands and Desertas Islands; ranges to the eastern Atlantic Ocean
 Pterodroma mollis, soft-plumaged petrel breeds on Gough Island, Antipodes Island, Tristan da Cunha, Marion Island, Crozet Islands, Kerguelan Islands, and Amsterdam Island
 Pterodroma mollis mollis breeds on Gough Island, Antipodes Island, and Tristan da Cunha
 Pterodroma mollis dubia breeds on Marion Island, Crozet Islands, Kerguelan Islands, and Amsterdam Island
 Pterodroma baraui, Barau's petrel breeds on Réunion Island and Rodrigues Island
 Pterodroma lessonii, white-headed petrel breeds on islands in the south Indian Ocean and south Pacific Ocean
 Pterodroma inexpectata, mottled petrel breeds on Stewart Island, Snares Islands, and southwestern South Island
 Pterodroma cahow, Bermuda petrel breeds on Nonsuch Island; ranges along the Gulf Stream
 Pterodroma hasitata, black-capped petrel breeds on Cuba, Hispaniola, Guadeloupe, and Dominica; ranges to the west Atlantic
 Pterodroma hasitata hasitata breeds on Cuba, Hispaniola, Guadeloupe, and Dominica; ranges to the west Atlantic
 Pterodroma hasitata caribbaea extinct
 Pterodroma externa, Juan Fernandez petrel breeds on Alejandro Selkirk Island
 Pterodroma incerta, Atlantic petrel breeds on Tristan da Cunha and Gough Island; ranges south Atlantic
 Pterodroma phaeopygia, Galapagos petrel breeds on the Galápagos Islands; ranges from Clipperton Island to northern Peru
 Pterodroma sandwichensis, Hawaiian petrel breeds on the Hawaiian Islands; ranges to Polynesia
 Pterodroma cervicalis, white-necked petrel breeds on the Kermadec Islands; ranges to south Pacific
 Pterodroma hypoleuca, Bonin petrel breeds on the Volcano Islands, Bonin Islands, and the western Hawaiian Islands; ranges to Polynesia
 Pterodroma nigripennis, black-winged petrel breeds in the southwest Pacific; ranges to south central Pacific
 Pterodroma axillaris, Chatham petrel breeds on Rangitira Island and adjacent islands
 Pterodroma cookii, Cook's petrel breeds on the islands of the coast of New Zealand; ranges to eastern and northern Pacific
 Pterodroma defilippiana, Masatierra petrel breeds on Juan Fernández Islands, San Ambrosio, and San Félix
 Pterodroma leucoptera, Gould's petrel breeds on the Cook Islands, Fiji, and Cabbage Tree Island off of eastern Australia
 Pterodroma leucoptera leucoptera breeds on Cabbage Tree Island off of eastern Australia; ranges to the south Pacific
 Pterodroma leucoptera caledonica breeds on New Caledonia
 Pterodroma leucoptera brevipes breeds on the Cook Islands and Fiji
 Pterodroma longirostris, Stejneger's petrel breeds on Alejandro Selkirk Island; ranges to eastern and northern Pacific
 Pterodroma pycrofti, Pycroft's petrel breeds on the small islands off the coast of New Zealand; ranges to north Pacific
 Pterodroma alba, Phoenix petrel breeds from French Polynesia to Kermadec Islands; ranges to the south Pacific
 Pterodroma occulta, Vanuatu petrel possible breeds on Banks Islands

Footnotes

References 
 

Pterodroma
Lists of birds
Procellariiformes